Rontarius Robinson (born April 8, 1982) is a former Canadian football defensive halfback.

Career

Robinson was signed as a free agent by the Saskatchewan Roughriders in 2005, and dressed for three games that year. In 2006, he dressed for a total of eighteen games, starting six at defensive back and linebacker. He finished the year with a total of 28 tackles, three interceptions, and a fumble recovery.

On May 23, 2008, he was signed as a free agent with the Hamilton Tiger-Cats. He was released on May 8, 2009.

He attended college at Howard University.

References

External links

Saskatchewan Roughriders players
1982 births
Living people
Howard University alumni
Howard Bison football players
Hamilton Tiger-Cats players
Players of American football from Tallahassee, Florida